LncRNA p53 regulated and ESC associated 1 is a non-coding RNA that in humans is encoded by the LNCPRESS1 gene.

References

Further reading